Kevin Parker (born 8 May 1945) is  a former Australian rules footballer who played with Fitzroy in the Victorian Football League (VFL).

Notes

External links 		
		
		
		
		
		

1945 births
Living people
Australian rules footballers from Victoria (Australia)		
Fitzroy Football Club players